Mount Overlord is a very large mountain which is an extinct stratovolcano, situated at the northwest limit of Deception Plateau, 50 miles inland from the Ross Sea and just east of the head of Aviator Glacier in Victoria Land. Its asymmetrical cone is on the edge of a plateau above Aviator Glacier. While most of the cone is ice-covered, Mount Overlord does have a 1.2-mile (0.8 kilometer) diameter caldera. Volcanic rocks from the western slope have been dated to about seven million years, so the volcano is thought to be extinct. 

It was so named by the northern party of New Zealand Geological Survey Antarctic Expedition (NZGSAE), 1962–63, because it "overlords" lesser peaks in the area.

See also
 List of volcanoes in Antarctica

Sources
 
 

Three-thousanders of Antarctica
Volcanoes of Victoria Land
Mountaineer Range
Extinct volcanoes
Miocene stratovolcanoes
Borchgrevink Coast